Trey McBrayer (born August 30, 1994) is an American professional wrestler currently signed to Impact Wrestling, where he performs under the ring name Trey Miguel, and is the current Impact X Division Champion in his second reign.

Early life 
Trey McBrayer was born on August 30, 1994, in Toledo, Ohio.

Professional wrestling career

Independent circuit (2009–present) 
McBrayer began training sometime in 2009 at the Glass City Pro Wrestling School until he eventually moved to Dayton, Ohio where he studied under the tutelage of Dave Crist.

On July 8, 2017, Miguel teamed with his future partners Dezmond Xavier and Zachary Wentz for the first time to defeat Ohio Is 4 Killers (Dave Crist, Jake Crist and Sami Callihan) in a doors match at CZW's iPPV EVILution. On April 17, 2018, at CZW's Welcome to the Combat Zone, Miguel was introduced as the newest member of The Rascalz alongside Myron Reed. After this, Miguel and Reed began teaming across the entire independent circuit as Wentz and Xavier, the other two Rascalz members teamed as well. Together, Miguel and Reed won the IWA Mid-South Tag Team Championship once on March 8 and the Rockstar Pro Trios Championship twice (once with Alex Colon and Dustin Rayz), on May 4 and May 9 respectively.

On September 1, 2017, Miguel defeated Jeremiah for the Rockstar Pro Championship, a title which he held for 91 days before dropping it to Jake Crist. Miguel then regained the title on February 2, 2018, defeating Crist but later that same night he lost the title to Jon Murray.

At a cross promotional event for Fight Club: PRO and Destiny Wrestling on April 4, 2019, Miguel defeated Penelope Ford, Kip Sabian, and Jake Atlas for the vacant Destiny Wrestling Next Generation Championship. He then made his first title defense on August 9, against Aiden Prince, Kevin Blackwood, Lionel Knight and Ryan Wright in a successful attempt.

On May 12, 2019, Miguel and Wentz won the WC Big Top Tag Team Championship at WrestleCircus event Encore by defeating The Dirty Devils (Andy Dalton and Isaiah James) and The Riegel Twins (Logan and Sterling) in a three-way match. After a successful title defense against Riegel Twins and Private Party at Big Top Revival, Miguel and Wentz vacated the titles on July 25.

Impact Wrestling

Early appearances (2017–2018)
Before being officially signed to Impact Wrestling, Miguel competed in a few "tryout" matches. The first being on the August 20, 2017 episode of Impact!, teaming with Jon Bolen where they lost to Ohio Versus Everything (Jake and Dave Crist). The latter being Miguel's trainer and the guy who helped break him into the company. On the September 6, 2018 episode of Impact!, Miguel made his second appearance by teaming with Zachary Wentz and Ace Austin as enhancement talents again against Ohio Versus Everything (Dave Crist, Jake Crist, and Sami Callihan) in a losing effort.

The Rascalz (2018–2020)

A vignette aired promoting the debut of Rascalz on the November 15 episode of Impact!. On the November 29 episode of Impact!, Miguel made his official debut alongside Dezmond Xavier and Zachary Wentz as the trio known as The Rascalz, accompanying them ringside when Xavier and Wentz competed in a tag team match against Chris Bey and Mike Sydal. In mid-2019, Trey and the Rascalz began a feud against Moose, which led to all the Rascalz making their pay-per-view debut against Moose and The North in a six-man tag team match at Rebellion, which Rascalz lost. During the match, the ring names of Xavier, Miguel and Wentz were shortened to Dez, Trey and Wentz respectively.

On the November 13, 2019 episode of Impact, Trey became the number one contender for the X Division Championship by pinning Petey Williams in a six-way match, but failed to win the title from Ace Austin at Hard to Kill. At Slammiversary, Trey received his first shot at the vacant Impact World Championship in a five-way elimination match against Ace Austin, Eddie Edwards, Rich Swann, and the returning Eric Young, but was eliminated first by Young. On November 11, it was revealed that The Rascalz would soon be leaving Impact and had interest from both WWE and All Elite Wrestling. During the November 17 tapings, The Rascalz were given a "send-off" by the Impact locker room. Trey confirmed the following day that he, Dez and Wentz were in fact done appearing on Impact Wrestling. Dez and Wentz went on to sign with WWE while Miguel remained a free agent.

X Division Champion (2021–present)
Miguel made a surprise return to Impact Wrestling on the January 26, 2021 episode of Impact, teaming with Tommy Dreamer, Rich Swann, and Willie Mack to defeat Chris Bey, Moose, Ken Shamrock, and Sami Callihan. During his return match, Trey's ring name was reverted to Trey Miguel. After many various low level feuds, Miguel began a heated high level feud with Callihan based on Callihan's theory that Miguel couldn't survive without Dez and Wentz. Throughout the deeply personal feud, Miguel would get tormented by Callihan in many ways including being forced to watch his trainee Sam Beale get beat down and be constantly told he "lost his passion". After weeks of back and forth attacks and mind games, the feud culminated in a last man standing match at Rebellion, which Miguel won.

In September, Miguel entered a tournament to determine a new X Division Champion, where he defeated Alex Zayne and Laredo Kid in the first round. At Bound for Glory, Miguel defeated El Phantasmo and Steve Maclin in the final to win the Impact X Division Championship. On the October 28 episode of Impact!, Miguel made his first successful title defense against New Japan Pro-Wrestling (NJPW) talent Rocky Romero. Miguel then retained his title against Laredo Kid and Steve Maclin at Turning Point, against Maclin at Hard To Kill, and against Jake Something at Sacrifice. On April 1, 2022, at Multiverse of Matches, Miguel successfully defended his X Division Championship against Blake Christian, Chris Bey, Jordynne Grace, Rich Swann, and Vincent in an Intergender Ultimate X match. At Rebellion, he lost the title to Ace Austin in a three-way match involving Mike Bailey, ending his reign at 182 days. Two weeks later, he failed to regain the title in a rematch at Under Siege.

On the May 12 episode of Impact!, Miguel competed in a Gauntlet for the Gold to determine the number one contender to Josh Alexander's Impact World Championship at Slammiversary, but was eliminated by Steve Maclin. On the May 26 episode of Impact!, Miguel defeated Alex Shelley to qualify for the Ultimate X match for the X Division Championship at Slammiversary. At the event, he failed to capture the title that was won by Mike Bailey. On the June 30 episode of Impact!, Miguel won a four-way match to get a shot at the X Division title. A day later, at Against All Odds, he failed to beat Bailey for the title.

On September 23, at Victory Road, Miguel competed in an Intergender Triple Threat Revolver to determine the number one contender for the X Division Championship, but was eliminated by eventual winner Frankie Kazarian. He later took part in a tournament to crown a new X Division Champion, defeating Alan Angels in the quarterfinals and Mike Bailey in the semifinals. On November 18, at Over Drive, Miguel defeated Black Taurus in the final by turning heel after blinding him with spray paint, and won the vacant title for a second time. On the December 1 episode of Impact!, Miguel explained what he needed to do to regain the title and sprayed green paint on it. On January 13, 2023, on the Countdown to Hard to Kill pre-show, Miguel defeated Taurus to successfully retain his title.

Personal life 
McBrayer was previously in a relationship with wrestling journalist Alicia Atout.

Championships and accomplishments 
Alpha-1 Wrestling
A1 Zero Gravity Championship (1 time)
Destiny Wrestling
Next Generation Championship (1 time)
Extreme Chaos Wrestling
Extreme Championship (1 time)
Horror Slam Wrestling
 Horror Slam Heavyweight Championship (1 time)
Impact Wrestling
 Impact X Division Championship (2 times, current)
 Impact X Division Championship Tournament (2 times, 2021, 2022)
Impact Year End Awards (1 time)
Match of the Year (2020) – 
Independent Wrestling Association Mid-South
IWA Mid-South Tag Team Championship (1 time) – with Myron Reed
Insane Wrestling Revolution
IWR United States Championship (1 time)
Mega Championship Wrestling
MEGA Championship (1 time)
Mega Title Tournament (2021)
Pro Wrestling Illustrated
 Ranked No. 171 of the top 500 singles wrestlers in the PWI 500 in 2020
Rockstar Pro Wrestling
American Luchacore Championship (2 times)
Rockstar Pro Championship (2 times)
Rockstar Pro Trios Championship (2 times) - with Myron Reed and, Alex Colon (1), Myron Reed and Dustin Rayz (1)
Rockin’ Robin Tournament (2017)
The Wrestling Revolver
Revolver Championship (1 time)
PWR Remix Championship (1 time)
Warrior Wrestling
Warrior Wrestling Championship (1 time)
Welterweight Wrestling
WW Championship (1 time)
WrestleCircus
WC Big Top Tag Team Championship (1 time) – with Zachary Wentz
 Xtreme Intense Championship Wrestling
 XICW Tag Team Championship (1 time) – with Aaron Williams, Dave Crist, Kyle Maverick, Dezmond Xavier, and Zachary Wentz

References

External links 

 
 Impact Wrestling profile
 

1994 births
Living people
21st-century professional wrestlers
American male professional wrestlers
Professional wrestlers from Ohio
TNA/Impact X Division Champions